Coda Rossa Winery is a winery in the Franklinville section of Franklin Township in Gloucester County, New Jersey, United States. The vineyard was first planted in 2002. The current owners obtained the property and winery in 2021, and previously Coda Rossa opened to the public in 2010. Coda Rossa has 10 acres of grapes under cultivation, and produces 1,500 cases of wine per year. The winery is named for the Italian words coda rossa which mean "red tail," because of the red-tailed hawks that live near the farm.

Wines
Coda Rossa Winery is in the Outer Coastal Plain AVA, and produces wine from Barbera, Cabernet Franc, Cabernet Sauvignon, Cayuga White, Chambourcin, Chardonnay, Concord, Durif (Petite Sirah), Merlot, Nebbiolo, Niagara, Pinot gris, Sangiovese, Sauvignon blanc, Syrah, Vidal blanc, and Zinfandel grapes. The winery also makes fruit wines from blackberries, blueberries, peaches, and raspberries.

Licensing, associations, and other properties
Coda Rossa has a plenary winery license from the New Jersey Division of Alcoholic Beverage Control, which allows it to produce an unrestricted amount of wine, operate up to 15 off-premises sales rooms, and ship up to 12 cases per year to consumers in-state or out-of-state. The winery is a member of the Garden State Wine Growers Association and the Outer Coastal Plain Vineyard Association. 
In 2004, the owners of Coda Rossa founded The Wine Room, an instructional winemaking facility in Cherry Hill, New Jersey.

See also
Alcohol laws of New Jersey
American wine
Judgment of Princeton
List of wineries, breweries, and distilleries in New Jersey
New Jersey Farm Winery Act
New Jersey Wine Industry Advisory Council
New Jersey wine

References

External links
Garden State Wine Growers Association
Outer Coastal Plain Vineyard Association

2008 establishments in New Jersey
Franklin Township, Gloucester County, New Jersey
Wineries in New Jersey
Tourist attractions in Gloucester County, New Jersey